Reinbolt Hills is a group of rocky hills, low to moderate in height and about 5 nautical miles (9 km) long, situated 9 nautical miles (17 km) east of Gillock Island at the eastern margin of the Amery Ice Shelf. Delineated in 1952 by John H. Roscoe from air photos taken by U.S. Navy Operation Highjump (1946–47), and named by him for Lieutenant Fred L. Reinbolt, U.S. Navy, co-pilot on Operation Highjump photographic flights over this area.
 

Hills of Mac. Robertson Land
Ingrid Christensen Coast